Mudan Evening Post, also known as Peony Evening News or Mudan Evening Daily News Paper, is a comprehensive evening newspaper published in simplified Chinese in the People's Republic of China.  The newspaper is a Heze-based lifestyle newspaper, sponsored and supervised by the Heze Daily Agency.

In January 1995, based on the original Caozhou Evening Post (曹州晚报), the Caozhou Daily Agency (曹州日报社) founded the Mudan Evening Post, which was published under the original Domestic Unified Issue Number of the Caozhou Evening Post.

References

Publications established in 1995
Daily newspapers published in China
Chinese-language newspapers (Simplified Chinese)